Ion Roșu (born 20 September 1947) is a Romanian former football striker.

Honours
Argeș Pitești
Divizia A: 1971–72

References

1947 births
Living people
Romanian footballers
Association football forwards
Liga I players
FC Argeș Pitești players
FC Progresul București players
FC Sportul Studențesc București players